Platystethus degener is a species of spiny-legged rove beetle in the family Staphylinidae. It is found in Europe and Northern Asia (excluding China), North America, and Southern Asia.

References

Further reading

 
 
 
 
 
 
 

Oxytelinae
Beetles described in 1878